The Ulster Footballer of the Year is the older of two association football player of the year awards in Northern Ireland. (The other is the Northern Ireland Football Writers' Association award.) It is awarded by Castlereagh Glentoran Supporters' Club to the player who is adjudged by an independent committee to have been the best of the season in the Irish Premiership. The award has been presented since the 1950–51 season, when the inaugural winner was Kevin McGarry of Cliftonville. The current holder of the award is Jamie Mulgrew, of Linfield. Glenn Ferguson has won the award most often: on three separate occasions.

Winners

Breakdown of winners by club

References

Association footballers in Northern Ireland
Northern Ireland
Annual events in Northern Ireland
1951 establishments in Northern Ireland
Awards established in 1951
Awards of Northern Ireland
Annual sporting events in the United Kingdom
Association football player non-biographical articles